Shatt Al-Arab Sport Club, is an Iraqi football team based in Shatt Al-Arab District, Basra, that plays in Iraq Division Three.

Managerial history

  Adel Taha Aboud
  Jalal Hussein

See also 
 2021–22 Iraq FA Cup

References

External links
 Shatt Al-Arab SC on Goalzz.com
 Iraq Clubs- Foundation Dates
 Basra Clubs Union

Football clubs in Iraq
1993 establishments in Iraq
Association football clubs established in 1993
Football clubs in Basra
Basra